Ray Ross may refer to:
Ray Ross (ice hockey) (born 1932), Canadian ice hockey player
Ray Ross (footballer, born 1900) (1900–?), Australian rules footballer for Essendon
Ray Ross (footballer, born 1903) (1903–1981), Australian rules footballer for Richmond and St Kilda

See also
Ray Rossi, New Jersey radio personality  
Ray Rosso (1916–2012), Italian-born American football coach